Ilya Alekseyevich Petrov (born 27 June 1995) is a Russian football player. He plays for FC SKA-Khabarovsk.

Club career
He made his professional debut in the Russian Football National League for FC Volga Nizhny Novgorod on 19 July 2014 in a game against FC Anzhi Makhachkala.

On 31 January 2018, he moved to the Portuguese club União de Leiria.

References

External links
 Profile at FNL official site
 

1995 births
Sportspeople from Nizhny Novgorod
Living people
Russian footballers
Russia youth international footballers
Russia under-21 international footballers
Association football midfielders
FC Krasnodar players
FC Volga Nizhny Novgorod players
FC Dynamo Moscow players
FC Mordovia Saransk players
FC Avangard Kursk players
U.D. Leiria players
FC Neftekhimik Nizhnekamsk players
FC Urozhay Krasnodar players
FC SKA-Khabarovsk players
Russian First League players
Campeonato de Portugal (league) players
Russian expatriate footballers
Expatriate footballers in Portugal
Russian expatriate sportspeople in Portugal